Nannoniscidae is a family of crustaceans belonging to the order Isopoda.

Genera:
 Austroniscoides Birstein, 1963
 Austroniscus Vanhöffen, 1914
 Exiliniscus Siebenaller & Hessler, 1981
 Nannoniscus G.O. Sars, 1870

References

Isopoda